

Otto Schünemann (6 October 1891 – 29 June 1944) was a German general during World War II. He was a recipient of the Knight's Cross of the Iron Cross with Oak Leaves. Schünemann was killed on 29 June 1944 near Mogilev in Belarus during the Soviet 1944 summer offensive, Operation Bagration by a Soviet air attack on the Belynitschi-Beresino road.

Awards and decorations

 Clasp to the Iron Cross (1939) 2nd Class (28 May 1940) & 1st Class (18 June 1940)
 German Cross in Gold on 11 February 1943 as Generalmajor and commander of the 337. Infanterie-Division
 Knight's Cross of the Iron Cross with Oak Leaves
 Knight's Cross on 20 December 1941 as Oberst and commander of Infanterie-Regiment 184
 Oak Leaves on 28 November 1943 as Generalleutnant and commander of the 337. Infanterie-Division

References

Citations

Bibliography

 
 
 

1891 births
1944 deaths
Lieutenant generals of the German Army (Wehrmacht)
German Army personnel of World War I
Prussian Army personnel
German Army personnel killed in World War II
Recipients of the clasp to the Iron Cross, 1st class
Recipients of the Gold German Cross
Recipients of the Knight's Cross of the Iron Cross with Oak Leaves
People from the Grand Duchy of Mecklenburg-Schwerin
People from Bad Doberan
German police officers
Military personnel from Mecklenburg-Western Pomerania
German Army generals of World War II
Deaths by airstrike during World War II